The Ruacana Hydroelectric Power Station is a hydroelectric power plant near Ruacana in northwest Namibia, close to the Angolan border. Commissioned in 1978, it is by far the largest power station in Namibia. Its operator is NamPower, the Namibian national electric power utility company.

Location
The power station is located near the town of Ruacana, across the Kunene River, in the Omusati Region of Namibia, adjacent to the international border with Angola. The power station is operated by NamPower, the Namibian national electric power utility company.

Overview
As of May 2020, Ruacana Hydroelectric Power Station is the largest electricity generating station in Namibia. It accounts for approximately 50 percent of the country's generation capacity. 

The first three 80 MW Francis turbine-generators were commissioned in 1978. In 2012, the three original turbines were tweaked to generate a maximum of 85 megawatts each. The fourth Francis turbine-generator was built by Alstom,  Andritz Hydro and Concor and commissioned on 5 April 2012. The power station is located underground near the bottom of the falls. The power station is operated by Namibia's national power utility company, NamPower.

Water Source
Several dams upstream help regulate the Kunene River to help the power station operate more efficiently. Further upstream is the Gove Dam in west-central Angola and the Olushandja Dam, on the tributary, Etaka River, is in Namibia.

See also
 List of power stations in Namibia

References

External links
Kunene River Awareness Kit As of 2010.

1978 establishments in South West Africa
Dams in Angola
Underground power stations
Energy infrastructure completed in 1978
Hydroelectric power stations in Namibia
Dams completed in 1975
Omusati Region